Kyaw Swar Lin is a Burmese military general who is current serving as the Quartermaster General in Myanmar Army.

Early life and education
Born in 1971, Kyaw Swar Lin graduated from the 35th intake of the Defense Services Academy.

Career
Kyaw Swar Lin served as a junior officer to Lieutenant-General Moe Myint Tun, commander of the Bureau of Special Operations. They served together on operations in Rakhine State prior to 2018. However, Kyaw Swar Lin came to prominence when he was appointed head of Tatmadaw's Mandalay-based Central Command, ranked as a Major General in 2018. In May 2020, he was the youngest person ever to be promoted to Lieutenant General within the Tatmadaw. He was also appointed quartermaster general, succeeding Lieutenant General Nyo Saw, who retired.

Kyaw Swar Lin runs the Myanmar Economic Corporation (MEC), and sits on Myanma Economic Holdings Limited’s patron group under Commander-in-Chief Min Aung Hlaing. He also manages the military budget, which has accounted for 13%-15% of the overall national budget every year since 2012.

Post coup involvement
As the commander of the Myanmar military (or Tatmadaw)’s Central Command, he is accused of ordering soldiers to open fire on anti-regime protesters in Mandalay in February and March 2021.

Personal life
Kyaw Swar Lin is married to Nan Ku Ku (နန်းကူကူး), a medical doctor, and has a daughter, Nan Lin Lae Oo, who is in her final year studying international studies at Toyo University.

References

1971 births
Living people
Burmese generals
Burmese military personnel
Defence Services Academy alumni
Far-right politics in Myanmar
Burmese nationalists